Janqur (also Romanized as Jānqūr) is a village in Meydan Chay Rural District, in the Central District of Tabriz County, East Azerbaijan Province, Iran. At the 2006 census, its population was 916, in 223 families.

References 

Populated places in Tabriz County